The United Nations General Assembly designated the 1990s as International Decade for Natural Disaster Reduction (IDNDR).

Its basic objective was to decrease the loss of life, property destruction and social and economic disruption caused by natural disasters, such as earthquakes, tsunamis, floods, landslides, volcanic eruptions, droughts, locust infestations, and other disasters of natural origin. 

An International Decade for Natural Disaster Reduction, beginning on 1 January 1990, was launched by the United Nations, following the adoption of Resolution 44/236 (22 December 1989). The decade was intended to reduce, through concerted international action, especially in developing countries, loss of life, property damage and social and economic disruption caused by natural disasters. To support the activities of the decade, a Secretariat was established at the United Nations Office in Geneva, in close association with UNDRO.

See also
International Day for Disaster Reduction
World Conference on Disaster Reduction
Disaster management

References

External links
UNISDR Regional Office for the Americas
PreventionWeb

International Recovery Platform
Disaster Reduction for Children & Youth website
HFA Pedia
stopdisastersgame.org

Disaster preparedness
Natural Disaster Reduction, International Decade for